Glenwood, also known as Eddy Titus Mansion, is a historic home located on Eddy's Lane in  Troy in Rensselaer County, New York.  The house consists of a -story, rectangular, red brick central block with a 2-story, "T" shaped wing.  The wing forms a courtyard and there is a 1-story porch around three sides of it.  The front facade is dominated by a full Ionic order portico with pediment in the Greek Revival style. It houses the offices of the Troy Housing Authority.

It was listed on the National Register of Historic Places in 1973.

References

Houses on the National Register of Historic Places in New York (state)
Greek Revival houses in New York (state)
Houses in Troy, New York
National Register of Historic Places in Troy, New York